Microbacterium rhizomatis is a Gram-positive and rod-shaped bacterium from the genus Microbacterium which has been isolated from the rhizome of a ginseng root from the Hwacheon mountain in Korea. Microbacterium rhizomatis produces β-glucosidase.

References

External links 

Type strain of Microbacterium rhizomatis at BacDive -  the Bacterial Diversity Metadatabase

Bacteria described in 2015
rhizomatis